The following highways are numbered 646:

Canada

United States